Pyruvate dehydrogenase phosphatase regulatory subunit is a protein that in humans is encoded by the PDPR gene.

Structure
The complete cDNA of PDPR, which contains 2885 base pairs, has an open reading frame of 2634 nucleotides encoding a putative presequence of 31 amino acid residues and a mature protein of 847. Characteristics of native PDPR include ability to decrease the sensitivity of the catalytic subunit to Mg2+, and reversal of this inhibitory effect by the polyamine spermine. A BLAST search of protein databases revealed that PDPr is distantly related to the mitochondrial flavoprotein dimethylglycine dehydrogenase, which functions in choline degradation.

Function 
The mitochondrial pyruvate dehydrogenase complex (PDC) catalyzes the oxidative decarboxylation of pyruvate, linking glycolysis to the tricarboxylic acid cycle and fatty acid (FA) synthesis. Knowledge of the mechanisms that regulate PDC activity is important, because PDC inactivation is crucial for glucose conservation when glucose is scarce, whereas adequate PDC activity is required to allow both ATP and FA production from glucose. The mechanisms that control mammalian PDC activity include its phosphorylation (inactivation) by a family of pyruvate dehydrogenase kinases (PDKs 1-4) and its dephosphorylation (activation, reactivation) by the pyruvate dehydrogenase phosphatases (PDPs 1 and 2).

Clinical significance
As PDPR is involved in the regulation of the central metabolic pathway, its participation in disease pathophysiology is likely, but there has been no published research on this thus far.

References

Further reading 

 
 
 
 

Proteins